The Treaty of Rastatt was a peace treaty between France and Austria that was concluded on 7 March 1714 in the Baden city of Rastatt to end the War of the Spanish Succession between both countries. The treaty followed the Treaty of Utrecht of 11 April 1713, which had ended hostilities between France and Spain, on the one hand, and Great Britain and the Dutch Republic, on the other. A third treaty at Baden, Switzerland, was required to end the hostilities between France and the Holy Roman Empire.

By 1713, all parties to the war had been militarily depleted, and it was unlikely that continuing the conflict would bring about any results in the foreseeable future. The First Congress of Rastatt opened in November 1713 between France and Austria. The negotiations culminated in the Treaty of Rastatt on 7 March 1714, which ended hostilities and complemented the Treaty of Utrecht, which had been signed the previous year.

The Treaty of Rastatt was negotiated by Marshal of France, Claude Louis Hector de Villars, and the Austrian Prince Eugene of Savoy.

The treaty is associated with changes in European politics to emphasise the balance of power.

Background
Austria began to negotiate the treaty with France after it had been abandoned by its allies, particularly Great Britain, during the negotiations for the Treaty of Utrecht. Great Britain feared a possible personal union of Austria and Spain under the Emperor Charles VI, who took the imperial throne in 1711 and claimed the Spanish throne, since that would shift the European balance of power toward the House of Habsburg.

In June 1713, France launched its Rhine campaign against the Holy Roman Empire and conquered Kaiserslautern, Landau and Breisgau. After those defeats, Emperor Charles VI accepted an offer by Louis XIV of France to reopen negotiations.

Territorial changes

Under the treaty, Austria received the Spanish territories in Italy of  Naples,  Milan,  Sardinia and the Southern Netherlands. Austria also received Freiburg and several other small areas at its eastern borders from France, which however retained Landau.

As a result of the treaty, the Habsburg Empire reached its largest territorial extent since the division of the possessions of Charles V in 1556. It became a power in Western and Southern Europe, in addition to its already-dominant influence in Central Europe. Moreover, bargaining in Rastatt gained for Austria much more than it was offered at Utrecht, at which it had originally also participated. However, Emperor Charles VI was outraged at the loss of Spain and thus considered the war's outcome an unacceptable failure. 

For France, the treaties of Utrecht and Rastatt confirmed the throne of Spain for the House of Bourbon but denied France the additional territorial gains that it had sought. The treaties also affirmed that the thrones of France and Spain could not be united.

See also 
List of treaties

References 
 
 

Rastatt Congress 1713
Rastatt Congress 1713
Rastatt Congress 1713
1714 in Austria
1714 in France
1714 treaties
Rastatt 1713
Rastatt 1713
1714 conferences
Margraviate of Baden
1714 in the Habsburg monarchy
France–Habsburg monarchy relations
Charles VI, Holy Roman Emperor

nn:Den første Rastatt-kongressen